Alice Louise Walpole  (born 1 September 1963) is a British diplomat who is the current Deputy Special Representative for Political Affairs and Electoral Assistance of the United Nations Assistance Mission for Iraq. She has previously served as British Ambassador to Luxembourg and to Mali.

Career
Walpole was educated at Norwich High School for Girls and New Hall, Cambridge (now Murray Edwards College).

She joined the Foreign and Commonwealth Office (FCO) in 1985. Following a posting as HM Consul-General in Basra, Iraq (2009–11), she became British Ambassador to the Grand Duchy of Luxembourg in July 2011. In 2016 she became Ambassador to the Republic of Mali and non-resident Ambassador to the Republic of Niger. In November 2017 United Nations Secretary-General António Guterres announced the appointment of Alice Walpole as the new Deputy Special Representative for Political Affairs and Electoral Assistance of the United Nations Assistance Mission for Iraq (UNAMI).

She was appointed Officer of the Order of the British Empire (OBE) in the 2017 New Year Honours for services to British Diplomacy.

Alice was appointed Director of Goodenough College in April 2021. Goodenough College is an educational charity that provides a stimulating and supportive residential community for over 700 outstanding international postgraduate scholars studying in London.

Personal life
Walpole is a daughter of Robert Walpole, 10th Baron Walpole and his first wife Judith ( Schofield, later Judith Chaplin), and a descendant of Sir Robert Walpole, who is generally regarded the de facto first Prime Minister of the United Kingdom.

In 1990, she married Dr Angel Carro Castrillo (of Switzerland), with whom she has six children. They divorced in 2010, having separated in 2002.

References

 

1963 births
Living people
People from Itteringham
Alice
Daughters of barons
People educated at Norwich High School for Girls
Alumni of New Hall, Cambridge
British women ambassadors
Ambassadors of the United Kingdom to Luxembourg
Ambassadors of the United Kingdom to Mali
United Nations operations in Iraq
Officers of the Order of the British Empire